The Learjet 85 was a Learjet development program by aircraft manufacturer Bombardier Aerospace.

The program was launched on October 30, 2007 and a mockup of the aircraft was unveiled in October 2008 at the NBAA show in Orlando. The Learjet 85 was to fit between the midsize and the super midsize segments of the market. Designed for type certification under FAR-25, it was the first Bombardier Aerospace business jet to feature a composite structure.

On January 15, 2015, Bombardier announced their decision to suspend the Learjet 85 program and cut 1000 associated jobs.

On October 29, 2015, Bombardier chief executive Alain Bellemare announced a 2015 $4.9 billion third quarter loss, including the cancellation of the Learjet 85 program.

Design and development
Computer software design tools were used on the project, including CATIA and HyperSizer, and similar wing technology employed as on the Bombardier CSeries.

Bombardier reported nearly 60 Learjet 85 orders at a price of US$17.2 million (2008 dollars). Flexjet announced it would be the initial launch customer with seven orders in 2011.

On October 21, 2010, Bombardier opened a Learjet 85 aircraft component manufacturing facility in Querétaro, Mexico. The plant was inaugurated by President Felipe Calderón. Some parts of the wing would have been manufactured in Belfast in Northern Ireland.

The first test flight was on 9 April 2014.

The development was "paused" in January 2015 as the aircraft development was consuming too much money and orders were lacking. The company suspended the Learjet 85 to concentrate on the CSeries and Global 7000/8000 instead. On October 29, 2015 the project was cancelled.

Specifications (Learjet 85)

References

External links

 Learjet 85 website archives on Archive.org

85
2010s United States business aircraft
Abandoned civil aircraft projects of the United States
T-tail aircraft
Twinjets
Low-wing aircraft
Aircraft first flown in 2014